7000 (seven thousand) is the natural number following 6999 and preceding 7001.

Selected numbers in the range 7001–7999

7001 to 7099
 7021 – triangular number
 7043 – Sophie Germain prime
 7056 = 842
 7057 – cuban prime of the form x = y + 1, super-prime
 7073 – Leyland number
 7079 – Sophie Germain prime, safe prime

7100 to 7199
 7103 – Sophie Germain prime, sexy prime with 7109
 7106 – octahedral number
 7109 – super-prime, sexy prime with 7103
 7121 – Sophie Germain prime
 7140 – triangular number, also a pronic number and hence  = 3570 is also a triangular number, tetrahedral number
 7151 – Sophie Germain prime
 7187 – safe prime
 7192 – weird number
 7193 – Sophie Germain prime, super-prime

7200 to 7299
 7200 – pentagonal pyramidal number
 7211 – Sophie Germain prime
 7225 = 852, centered octagonal number
 7230 = 362 + 372 + 382 + 392 + 402 = 412 + 422 + 432 + 442
 7246 – centered heptagonal number
 7247 – safe prime
 7260 – triangular number
 7267 – decagonal number
 7272 – Kaprekar number
 7283 – super-prime
 7291 – nonagonal number

7300 to 7399
 7338 – Fine number.
 7349 – Sophie Germain prime
 7351 – super-prime, cuban prime of the form x = y + 1
 7381 – triangular number
 7385 – Keith number
 7396 = 862

7400 to 7499
 7417 – super-prime
 7433 – Sophie Germain prime
 7471 – centered cube number
 7481 – super-prime, cousin prime

7500 to 7599
 7503 – triangular number
 7523 – balanced prime, safe prime, super-prime
 7537 – prime of the form 2p-1
 7541 – Sophie Germain prime
 7559 – safe prime
 7560 – highly composite number
 7561 – Markov prime
 7568 – centered heptagonal number
 7569 = 872, centered octagonal number
 7583 – balanced prime

7600 to 7699
 7607 – safe prime, super-prime
 7612 – decagonal number
 7614 – nonagonal number
 7626 – triangular number
 7643 – Sophie Germain prime, safe prime
 7647 – Keith number
 7649 – Sophie Germain prime, super-prime
 7691 – Sophie Germain prime
 7699 – super-prime, emirp, sum of first 60 primes, first prime above 281 to be the sum of the first k primes for some k

7700 to 7799
 7703 – safe prime
 7714 – square pyramidal number
 7727 – safe prime
 7739 – member of the Padovan sequence
 7744 = 882, square palindrome not ending in 0
 7750 – triangular number
 7753 – super-prime
 7770 – tetrahedral number
 7776 = 65
 7777 – Kaprekar number

7800 to 7899
 7810 – ISO/IEC 7810 is the ISO's standard for physical characteristics of identification cards
 7823 – Sophie Germain prime, safe prime, balanced prime
 7825 – magic constant of n × n normal magic square and n-Queens Problem for n = 25. Also the first counterexample in the Boolean Pythagorean triples problem.
 7841 – Sophie Germain prime, balanced prime, super-prime
 7875 – triangular number
 7883 – Sophie Germain prime, super-prime
 7897 – centered heptagonal number

7900 to 7999
 7901 – Sophie Germain prime
 7909 – Keith number
 7912 – weird number
 7919 – thousandth prime number
 7920 – the order of the Mathieu group M11, the smallest sporadic simple group
 7921 = 892, centered octagonal number
 7944 – nonagonal number
 7957 – super-Poulet number
 7965 – decagonal number
 7979 – highly cototient number

Prime numbers
There are 107 prime numbers between 7000 and 8000:
7001, 7013, 7019, 7027, 7039, 7043, 7057, 7069, 7079, 7103, 7109, 7121, 7127, 7129, 7151, 7159, 7177, 7187, 7193, 7207, 7211, 7213, 7219, 7229, 7237, 7243, 7247, 7253, 7283, 7297, 7307, 7309, 7321, 7331, 7333, 7349, 7351, 7369, 7393, 7411, 7417, 7433, 7451, 7457, 7459, 7477, 7481, 7487, 7489, 7499, 7507, 7517, 7523, 7529, 7537, 7541, 7547, 7549, 7559, 7561, 7573, 7577, 7583, 7589, 7591, 7603, 7607, 7621, 7639, 7643, 7649, 7669, 7673, 7681, 7687, 7691, 7699, 7703, 7717, 7723, 7727, 7741, 7753, 7757, 7759, 7789, 7793, 7817, 7823, 7829, 7841, 7853, 7867, 7873, 7877, 7879, 7883, 7901, 7907, 7919, 7927, 7933, 7937, 7949, 7951, 7963, 7993

References

Integers